The Los Arquillos is an 18th-century structure located in Vitoria, Spain. It was architecturally designed to link the old part of the town situated on the higher ground with the new part of the town then under construction on lower ground.

It was declared Bien de Interés Cultural in 1984.

References 

 This article is largely based on the equivalent article on Spanish Wikipedia.

Buildings and structures in Vitoria-Gasteiz
Bien de Interés Cultural landmarks in Álava